Hugo Guillermo Chávez Fernández (born 16 October 1976) is a Mexican former football defender. He won two caps for the Mexico national team and was a member of the Mexican squad at the 2001 FIFA Confederations Cup.

Career
Born in Veracruz, Chávez began playing football with Tiburones Rojos de Veracruz in 1993. He also played for Monarcas Morelia, UANL Tigres and Puebla F.C.

Honours
Morelia
Mexican Primera División: Invierno 2000

References

External links
Hugo Chávez at Official Liga MX Profile
 
 
 

1976 births
Living people
Mexico international footballers
2001 FIFA Confederations Cup players
C.D. Veracruz footballers
Atlético Morelia players
Tigres UANL footballers
Club Puebla players
Footballers from Veracruz
Mexican footballers
Association football defenders